"My Favorite Accident" is a song by the pop punk band Motion City Soundtrack. It features on their debut album, I Am the Movie and was released as their second single in Europe. This song was featured in the video game Burnout 3: Takedown, and also featured in Tony Hawks Gigantic Skatepark Tour along with "The Future Freaks Me Out".

Formats and track listings

CD
 "My Favorite Accident" - 3:20
 "Boombox Generation" - 3:07

Music video
The video for "My Favorite Accident" was shot at Joshua Cain's brother's home on a very limited budget, and has been noted for "poking fun at your usual music video relationship".  The video features frontman Justin Pierre going through a rough patch in his relationship with a large pink bunny rabbit. It also includes the band's moog player, Jesse Johnson, doing his now famous "moogstand", where he does a handstand on his moog synthesizer.

References

Motion City Soundtrack songs
2003 singles
2002 songs
Epitaph Records singles
Songs written by Joshua Cain
Songs written by Justin Pierre